Ranisankail is an Upazila of Thakurgaon District in the Division of Rangpur, Bangladesh.

Geography
Ranisankail is one of the ancient areas of Bengal. It lies in the North-east corner of Bangladesh and has a total area of 287.59 km2. It lies about 420 km from Dhaka, the capital City of Bangladesh. The main rivers flowing through Ranisankail are the Kulic, Nagar, and Timai rivers. Land use total: cultivable land, 22405.09 hectares; fallow land, 6115.74; single crop, 30%, double crop, 55%; and treble crop 15%; cultivable land under irrigation, 69%.

Ranisankail upazila is bounded by Baliadangi and Thakurgaon Sadar upazilas on the north, Thakurgaon Sadar upazila on the east, Hemtabad CD block in Uttar Dinajpur district, West Bengal, India, on the south and Haripur Upazila on the west.

Demographics
Par the 2001 Bangladesh census, the upazila had a population of 196134, including males 101404, females 94730; Muslim 151890, Hindu 42647, Buddhist 805, Christian 14 and others 778.

At the 1991 Bangladesh census, Ranisankail had a population of 156107 inhabitants. Males constitute 51.67% of the population and females 48.33%. The number of adults was 76,136. Ranisankail had an average literacy rate of 25.7% (7+ years), below the national average of 32.4%.

Ranisankail (Town) consists of five mouzas. The area of the town is 13.94 km2. The town has a population of 25500; male 52.09%, female 47.91%; population density per km2 970. Literacy rate among the town people is 42.9%.

Population 156107; male 51.67%, female 48.33%. Muslim 76.23%, Hindu 22.79%, Christian 0.30% and others 0.98%; ethnic nationals: Santal 537 families.
Main occupations Agriculture 53.7%, agricultural laborer 28.52%, wage laborer 2.59%, commerce 6.41%, service 2.41% and others 6.37%.

Economy
Land control - Among the peasants, 3.43% are landless, 14.01% marginal, 12.78% small, 64.59% intermediate and 5.19% rich; cultivable land per head 0.13 hectare.

Places of interest
Ranisankail is not only known for its natural environment, but also for its historical places. They include the Khunia Dighi Memorial, Palace of King Tonko Nath, Ramrai Dighi (a pond covering 50 acres), Nekmord Oras mela (Fair of Nekmardon), Nekamard Shah Nasiruddin Mazar. Nekmarad Hat. Katihar Hat in Razore village (known for Hindu shib mondir, Rash mela, Extinct Maghi Mela), Kulic river, Gorkoi Nath mondir (Temple-900 Years old), Dharmagar, Banglagar, Shidassory Pond (sida Digi, Bhandagram), Ranisonkail Pilot High School, Ancient Primary School (100 years old) and Rautnagar hat.

Administration
Ranisankail Thana, now an upazila, was formed in 1837.

The Upazila is divided into Ranisankail Municipality and eight union parishads: Bachor, Dharmagarh, Hossaingaon, Kashipur, Lehemba, Nonduar, Nekmarad, and Rator. The union parishads are subdivided into 124 mauzas and 124 villages.

Upazila Nirbahi Officer (UNO): Sohel Sultan Zulkar Nain Kabir

Transport
There are some highway bus services from Dhaka, Chittagoang, Rajshahi to Ranisankail run by companies such as BRTC, Hanif, Nabil Poribahan, Asad Enterprise, Ahad Enterprise, Islam, Rozina, Shymoli, Rahbar, ALam Enterprise, Taj Poribahan and others. Most of them go from Shamoly, Asadgate, Gabtoli of Dhaka. A bus trip from Dhaka to Ranisankail takes about 9–10 hours. These buses go through Bangabandhu Jamuna bridge by N5 highway road. 

Ranisankail to Chittagong takes 15 to 16 hours via Dhaka, Cumilla.

And Rajshahi to Ranisankail takes about 8–9 hours. Some BRTC buses go Rajshahi Via Gobindaganj.

Gallery

References

Upazilas of Thakurgaon District